Donald Brown (born July 8, 1985) is a Canadian football defensive back. He was signed as a free agent by the BC Lions of the Canadian Football League in 2008 and was released during the 2009 BC Lions season training camp. He played college football at Wingate. Brown also played for the Bloomington Edge.

External links
Just Sports Stats
BC Lions bio

1985 births
Living people
American players of Canadian football
BC Lions players
Canadian football defensive backs
People from Morganton, North Carolina
Wingate Bulldogs football players
Winnipeg Blue Bombers players
Bloomington Edge players